The 2005 Copa Libertadores Final was a two-legged football match-up to determine the 2005 Copa Libertadores champion.

Qualified teams

Road to the final

Final summary

First leg

Second leg

External links
CONMEBOL's official website

1
Copa Libertadores Finals
Copa Libertadores Final 2005
Copa Libertadores Final 2005
Copa
Brazilian football clubs in international competitions